Kangan (also Romanized as Kangān) is a village in Momenabad Rural District, in the Central District of Sarbisheh County, South Khorasan Province, Iran. At the 2006 census its population was 160 in 53 families.

References 

Populated places in Sarbisheh County